Oxalis dillenii, also the southern wood-sorrel, slender yellow woodsorrel, and Dillen's oxalis, is species in the wood-sorrel family Oxalidaceae in the genus Oxalis. Like other Oxalis species, the leaves of this plant resemble clover leaves, with three leaflets. It is often considered a weed, and can be found worldwide, but likely originated in North America.

References

dillenii